The Tan rabbit is a small fancy breed of rabbit shown throughout 
the world. While originally from England, in recent years it has gained popularity in the United States. Tans come in four varieties: black, blue, chocolate and lilac. Full grown Tans weigh 4-6 pounds.

About Tans 
Tans originally come from England where they have been shown since the late 1800s.

In the United States, the accepted adult weight ranges are:
 Does (females): 4 - 6 pounds
 Bucks (males): 4 - 5½ pounds

Tans are a full arched breed. Rabbits with this type show an arch starting at the nape of their neck, running smoothly over their shoulders, midsection and hips. Tans have a very lean, compact, well balanced body. Tans should be short and deep in body type. They are visually striking because of their unique markings, contrast and intensity of their coloration. There are four varieties (colors) in the Tan breed: black, blue, chocolate and lilac. All four varieties have identical patterned markings. The Tan coloration is an intense, deep red color that is should be even from the chest to tail.

Feeding
Tans are often fed a diet of pellets and Timothy hay. They typically do not have an issue with going over the ideal maximum weight, so obesity is less of a concern than it is with other breeds. Most breeders recommend a heaping half cup of pellets once a day.

Housing 
Tans are a fairly small rabbit and can be housed in a cage as small as 24" X 18"  as long as they receive regular exercise. Cages preferably should be all-wire otherwise as this helps prevent respiratory disease. If the rabbit is to be housed in a hutch with solid sides and a solid roof, at least part of the cage should be made of wire to promote ventilation.

Exercise 
Being an active animal, Tans need regular exercise. They should never be allowed to roam an area outside their cage unattended. All areas they are allowed to explore should first be rabbit-proofed. Rabbit safe toys are good to keep in their cage.

Breeding 
There are four varieties (colors) in the Tan breed: black, chocolate, blue and lilac. While Tans are shown by variety, not group, in terms of color genetics there are two basic informal color groups: black/blue and chocolate/lilac.  Blue is the recessive of black and lilac is the recessive of chocolate. Many recommend breeders who are just starting out to stay within one color group until you become more familiar with color genetics. This means breeding black to black or black to blue or chocolate to chocolate or chocolate to lilac. It is traditionally not recommended to breed a recessive color to another recessive color (i.e. blue to blue), but such crosses can occasionally be successful for the advanced breeder.

While the average Tan litter is around 4 babies, litter sizes can certainly vary. Tans are not known for having common genetic defects. In general, most Tan babies will be born healthy. However, Tans are a very hyperactive breed and sometimes as a result they will have babies outside the nest box or have them inside the nest box but inadvertently step on the babies as they jump in and out of the box. These problems are more common with new moms and nervous and/or unsocialized rabbits. These issues can be reduced by not allowing strangers in the barn and keeping a calm, stress free environment for the first week or so following kindling (birth). Additionally, Tans that are raised from birth with constant handling will be less stressed by the presence of humans when they have their own babies.

All Tans are born with the patterned marking. In that sense, you will not get any "mismarked" in a litter like is common with other marked breeds such as Dutch, English Spots, Hotots, etc. While marking, type and color quality will vary, typically the majority of babies produced will at meet the minimum requirements to be shown at an ARBA sanctioned show. Although all herd are different, in general butting teeth and split penis seem to be the most common genetic disqualifications seen on the show table. Breeders should be extra vigilant of these issues when evaluating potential show stock. Ripped/pulled teeth, ripped/pulled toenails and broken tails are common disqualifications that are not genetic in nature and should not affect one's decision as to whether or not the rabbit should be used for breeding.

Depending upon location, the most difficult part of working with Tans may be finding stock. The American Tan Rabbit Specialty Club (ATRSC) in the United States and the National Tan Rabbit Club in Great Britain both maintain lists of club members on their websites. Some breeders will ship rabbits if the buyer is not within driving distance.  Many individuals throughout the world attend the annual American Rabbit Breeders Association (ARBA) National Convention to buy rabbits that are not available locally. The ARBA National Convention is held each fall in a different part of the United States. The American Tan Rabbit Specialty Club (ATRSC) also hosts a Tan National Show each spring in a different location within the United States.

Showing 

In the United States, the ARBA Standard of Perfection is the official publication that outlines the show requirements for each breed. "All breed" shows are held in various locations throughout the country nearly every weekend. At these shows all ARBA accepted breeds compete within their respective breed for the Best of Breed honor. Amongst all Best of Breeds a Best in Show winner is selected. Sometimes there are awards given to other top animals at the show, such as Reserve Best in Show or Best of Group.

Tans are judged as a full-arch "running breed" in the United States. This means they are allowed to move freely on the show table as they are evaluated by the judge to best evaluate the type, color and markings of the animal.

In the United Kingdom the British Rabbit Council (BRC) determines the show criteria for their sanctioned shows.  The National Tan Rabbit Club  is also the breed club for the breed in the United Kingdom and was the first breed club ever to represent the Tan Rabbit for enthusiasts.

See also

 List of rabbit breeds
 Brown Chestnut of Lorraine

References

External links 
 
  (ARBA)
  (ATRSC)
  (BRC)

Rabbit breeds originating in England
Rabbits as pets